Seichō no Ie  is a syncretic, monotheistic, New Thought Japanese new religion that has spread since the end of  World War II. It emphasizes gratitude for nature, the family, ancestors and, above all, religious faith in one universal God. Seichō no Ie is the world's largest New Thought group. By the end of 2010 it had over 1.6 million followers and 442 facilities, mostly located in Japan.

History 
In 1930, Masaharu Taniguchi, working as an English translator, published the first issue of what he called his "non-denominational truth movement magazine", which he named Seichō no Ie to help teach others of his beliefs. This was followed by forty volumes of his "Truth of Life" philosophy by 1932. Over the next forty years, he published an additional four hundred–odd books and toured many countries in Europe, South America, and North America with his wife Teruko, to lecture on his beliefs personally. Ernest Holmes, founder of Religious Science, and his brother Fenwicke were of great assistance to Taniguchi. Fenwicke traveled to Japan and co-authored several books, with one called The Science of Faith becoming a cornerstone of the denomination.

Taniguchi died in a Nagasaki hospital on June 17, 1985, at the age of ninety-one. Today the president of Seichō no Ie is Masanobu Taniguchi.

In the 2000s, Seicho-no-Ie Fundamental Movement seceded from HQ. As of 2017, there are  three factions of the original movement. The two largest factions are led by Masanobu Taniguchi, the president of Seichō no Ie; a group of elder teachers of Seichō no Ie known as Manabushi leads the other faction. The Manabushi only want to teach the fundamentals taught by the founder: Masaharu Taniguchi. One lone teacher who does not want to confront the current president of Seichō no Ie leads the last group.

See also
 List of New Thought denominations and independent centers
 List of New Thought writers

References

Further reading
 Clarke, Peter B. (ed.), A Bibliography of Japanese New Religious Movements: With Annotations and an Introduction to Japanese New Religions at Home and Abroad - Plus an Appendix on Aum Shinrikyo. Surrey, UK: Japan Library/Curzon, 1999. .
 Clarke, Peter B. (ed.). Japanese New Religions: In Global Perspective. Surrey, UK: Curzon Press, 2000. .
 Gottlieb, Nanette, and Mark McLelland (eds.). Japanese Cybercultures. London; New York: Routledge, 2003. , .
 Masaharu Taniguchi. Religious Leaders of America, 2nd ed. Gale Group, 1999. Reproduced in Biography Resource Center. Farmington Hills, Mich.: Gale, 2008.

External links 
 

Japanese new religions
Monotheistic religions
New Thought denominations
Religious organizations based in Japan
Religious syncretism in Japan
Shinto new religious movements